

Players

Competitions

Division One

League table

Results summary

League position by match

Matches

FA Cup

League Cup

Appearances and goals

References

Books

1965-66
Northampton Town